Drighlington and Adwalton railway station served the village of Drighlington, West Yorkshire, England from 1856 to 1962 on the Leeds, Bradford and Halifax Junction Railway. The A650 Drighlington Bypass now runs through the site of the station.

History 
The station opened as Drighlington on 20 August 1856 by the Great Northern Railway. Its name was changed to Drighlington and Adwalton on 12 June 1961. It closed to both passenger and goods traffic on 1 January 1962.

References

External links 

Disused railway stations in Leeds
Former Great Northern Railway stations
Railway stations in Great Britain opened in 1856
Railway stations in Great Britain closed in 1962
1856 establishments in England
1962 disestablishments in England